Ahmad Danial bin Ahmad Asri (born 1 April 2000) is a Malaysian footballer who plays for Selangor in the Malaysia Super League as a forward.

Club career

Early year
Danial was in the Selangor youth team at the age of 18–19, having arrived from local side SMK Dato' Harun, with represent SuperMokh Cup in 2017. He has also been a key player and captain of the Selangor III and made a total of 42 appearances from 2018 to 2019.

Selangor

Danial made a professional career when he was called by Selangor II team head coach Michael Feichtenbeiner after scoring two goals during a friendly match against Geylang International. He also played in all matches for the 2020 season with Selangor II and was the local top scorer in the Premier League with seven goals.  He made his debut with senior team in the 2020 Malaysia Cup against Melaka United.

In December 2020, Selangor confirmed that Danial would be definitely promoted to senior's first team for the 2021 season.

Career statistics

Club

Honours
Selangor
 Malaysia Cup runner-up: 2022

Individual
Malaysia Premier League Local Top Scorer : 2020

References

Living people
Malaysian footballers
Selangor FA players
Malaysia Premier League players
Malaysia Super League players
Malaysian people of Malay descent
People from Selangor
Association football forwards
2000 births
Competitors at the 2021 Southeast Asian Games
Southeast Asian Games competitors for Malaysia